Farringdon railway station may refer to:
 Farringdon station, a main line and London Underground station
 Farringdon Halt railway station, a station on the closed Meon Valley Railway in East Hampshire

It may also be confused with:
 Faringdon railway station, a closed Great Western Railway station in Oxfordshire
 Farington railway station, a closed station on the former North Union Railway in Lancashire